Barren Ground is a settlement at the western end of the island of Saint Helena, north west of Blue Hill.  It is administratively part of Blue Hill, but is locally seen as a distinct place.

Geography
Barren Ground lies at the top of Swanley Valley and Old Woman's Valley, about 700 m above sea level.  The scenery is dominated by High Hill to the west and The Saddle to the north.  Despite the name, the area is fertile, but due to the steepness of the terrain is largely woodland.  In Saint Helena's 2008 Land Development Plan, Barren Ground is marked as an area for additional housing development.

Communications
Road access is via Blue Hill.  The journey time into Jamestown is about 30 minutes.  The road into Barren Ground heads north-east from Blue Hill and, if extended, would reach Head O'Wain, thus shortening the journey into Jamestown.  It is possible to reach the sea on foot by descending Swanley Valley or Old Woman's Valley, but this is not an advertised route due to its difficulty.

The area is served by the island's telephone network and Broadband Internet access is available.  The nearest call box is beside the bus stop at Redgate, Blue Hill Village.  TV service is provided to parts of the area from a relay at Head O'Wain, and to other parts from the relay at The Depot, the large mast adjacent to the church of St Helena and the Cross.  FM service is provided by a relay Saint FM transmitter at Head O'Wain on 91.1 MHz, and secondarily by the main Saint FM transmitter at High Knoll on 93.1 MHz.

Astronomy
The sparse population makes the area potentially ideal for astronomy, due to minimal light pollution.  However, cloud cover can be a problem as Barren Ground is situated in the lee of the main ridge of the island.

Shopping
There are no shops in Barren Ground.  The nearest retail outlet is the Blue Hill shop, on the western side of Blue Hill.

Industry and employment
There is no local manufacturing industry and most people work outside the Barren Ground area.  Some residents work from home and one business has its base in the area (see External Links).

External links
 Burgh House Limited, company based in Barren Ground providing additional information about the area
 family.burghhouse.com, website for a Barren Ground resident family
 Burgh House, website for a house in Barren Ground, with useful location information

Populated places in Saint Helena, Ascension and Tristan da Cunha